Aquatics at the 1967 Southeast Asian Peninsular Games included swimming, diving, and waterpolo events. The sports of aquatics were held at Bangkok, Thailand. Aquatics events was held between 12 December to 15 December.

Swimming
Men's events

Women's events

Diving

Waterpolo

References
http://eresources.nlb.gov.sg/newspapers/Digitised/Issue/straitstimes19671213.aspx
http://eresources.nlb.gov.sg/newspapers/Digitised/Issue/straitstimes19671214.aspx
http://eresources.nlb.gov.sg/newspapers/Digitised/Issue/straitstimes19671215.aspx
http://eresources.nlb.gov.sg/newspapers/Digitised/Issue/straitstimes19671216.aspx

Southeast Asian Peninsular Games